Chegarman-e Gholamhoseyn (also Romanized as Chegārmān-e Gholāmḩoseyn; also known as Gholāmḩoseynābād) is a village in Qaleh-ye Khvajeh Rural District, in the Central District of Andika County, Khuzestan Province, Iran. At the 2006 census, its population was 240, in 41 families.

References 

Populated places in Andika County